Stylobryon is a monotypic genus of golden algae in the family Dinobryaceae. It has one known species Stylobryon insignis .

It has been found in Lake Erie, north America.

In 1866, Alfred Cheatham Stokes, described in North America Stylobryon abbottii , this is now accepted as Poteriodendron petiolatum var. abbottii .

References

External links
 Stylobryon at algaebase.org
 Stylobryon at the World Register of Marine Species (WoRMS)

Chrysophyceae
Algae genera
Heterokont genera
Monotypic algae genera
Taxa described in 1874